Liparis swenssonii, commonly known as northern tom cats, is a plant in the orchid family and is endemic to far eastern Australia. It is a lithophytic orchid with one or two leaves and up to thirty or more greenish, strongly scented flowers. It grows on rocks or in rocky soil in moist forests.

Description 
The sepals and petals spread widely apart from each other. Flowering occurs between February and July.

Taxonomy and naming
Liparis swenssonii was first formally described in 1906 by Frederick Manson Bailey and the description was published in the Department of Agriculture Queensland, Botany Bulletin. The collection was based on a specimen collected by Carl Swensson.

Distribution and habitat
Northern tom cats grows on rocks, sometimes in rocky soil in rainforest or moist open forest in coastal ranges between the Clarence River in New South Wales and Gympie in Queensland.

References 

swenssonii
Orchids of New South Wales
Orchids of Queensland
Endemic orchids of Australia
Plants described in 1906